Mburucuyá Department is a  department of Corrientes Province in Argentina.

External links
 Federal website

Departments of Corrientes Province